There have been ten instances of  a death of a candidate during a British general election since 1918 (the first election in which all constituencies in the United Kingdom voted on the same day).

The rules governing the procedure for dealing with the death of a candidate occur in the Representation of the People Act 1983. Unless the deceased candidate was standing as an independent, their death results in the election being postponed whether it is a general election or a by-election. The poll is stopped immediately even if voting has closed and the votes are being counted, unless the death occurs after the declaration of the result.

The Returning Officer must be shown proof of the death; a new election is then arranged for 28 days after this date. The time at which the Returning Officer hears of the death is the relevant factor not the date of the death itself. There is no requirement for other nominated candidates to re-register, a new candidate may be nominated by the party of the deceased and any of the other candidates may at this point withdraw from the election, but independent candidates and candidates for other parties cannot be nominated.

According to the Electoral Commission, if the deceased candidate was standing as an independent, the election continues as normal. The Speaker of the House of Commons seeking re-election is treated effectively as if he were standing for a party, except that in this case other candidates may be nominated by any party or as independents as the proceedings begin afresh.

Under all circumstances the deposit will be returned to the estate of the deceased candidate. In the unlikely event that a deceased independent candidate wins, the election is re-held with no new candidates and all deposits are returned. If it is a tie between a deceased independent candidate and one or more living candidates, the deceased candidate is ignored.

In the 2015 general election, former Eurovision singer Ronnie Carroll, who was standing in the Hampstead and Kilburn constituency as an independent  candidate, died on 13 April 2015. As he was an independent, the poll was not cancelled and proceeded with his name on the ballot paper. He gained 113 votes and sixth place in poll.

Deaths during elections since 1900

notes: *= likely winner, had they lived. Replacement won in their place.

Bibliography
Notes

References

 - Total pages: 298

External links
House of Commons library

General elections to the Parliament of the United Kingdom
General election candidates
Political
United Kingdom politics-related lists